Alfons Dirnberger (4 September 1941 – 18 March 2022) was an Austrian footballer who played as a midfielder. He made three appearances for the Austria national team from 1965 to 1966.

References

External links
 

1941 births
2022 deaths
Austrian footballers
Association football midfielders
Austria international footballers
FK Austria Wien players
First Vienna FC players